Waikowhai is an Auckland suburb, under the local governance of the Auckland Council. Waikowhai has the largest block of native forest left on the Auckland isthmus. The block was considered the too infertile for farming and subsequently not cleared but given to the Wesley Mission. Today the forest block hosts a valuable sample of Auckland's original fauna and flora. Waikōwhai Walkway extends for  linking Onehunga to Lynfield Cove.

Etymology

The name Waikowhai (sometimes spelt Waikowai) is mentioned on early European maps of the area and in newspapers from the 1850s. The meaning of the name in Māori is unclear, either meaning kōwhai tree waters, or yellow water.

History

The southern Auckland isthmus has been settled by Tāmaki Māori since at least the 13th century. A traditional trail existed at Waikowhai, linking Te Tōanga Waka (the Whau River portage) in the west to Onehunga in the east. The iwi and hapū of the Manukau Harbour moved seasonally between different areas, collecting seasonal resources and farming. By the early 18th century, the area was within the rohe of Waiohua. After the defeat of Kiwi Tāmaki, the paramount chief of the iwi, the area became part of the rohe of Ngāti Whātua (modern-day Ngāti Whātua Ōrākei). There are two known sites of significance in the Waikowhai area, that are recorded on the 1853 map of the Manukau Harbour by Commander B. Drury: the Cape Horn headland is the recorded location of a fortified pā called Matengarahi, and the modern day Wattle Bay area, a site where many shell middens have been found, was called Taunahi.

The land at Waikowhai was purchased through Robert FitzRoy's pre-emptive waiver scheme on 26 March 1844, as a part of Deed 208. Most of the modern suburb of Waikowhai was land gifted to the Wesleyan Methodist Church by the Crown in 1850, for the use of the Wesleyan mission. The land was used by the mission for fishing and swimming by the pupils.

Waikowhai Bay was a popular destination for swimmers, day-trippers and picnickers in Auckland during the early 20th century. Gradually the bay lost popularity in the 1930s, due to increased pollution in the Manukau Harbour.

In 1927, the Wesley Trust began developing and subdividing the land at Waikowhai for suburban housing, which was followed by government housing developments from the 1940s onwards.

In the 1950s and 1960s, a rubbish tip and landfill was established at Waikowhai Park, which negatively impacted the area; causing pollution and blocking access to Waikowhai Bay.

Demographics

Waikowhai had a population of 5,439 at the 2018 New Zealand census, an increase of 483 people (9.7%) since the 2013 census, and an increase of 606 people (12.5%) since the 2006 census. There were 1,518 households, comprising 2,715 males and 2,721 females, giving a sex ratio of 1.0 males per female, with 1,089 people (20.0%) aged under 15 years, 1,449 (26.6%) aged 15 to 29, 2,409 (44.3%) aged 30 to 64, and 492 (9.0%) aged 65 or older.

Ethnicities were 28.7% European/Pākehā, 6.7% Māori, 22.0% Pacific peoples, 47.3% Asian, and 4.3% other ethnicities. People may identify with more than one ethnicity.

The percentage of people born overseas was 52.0, compared with 27.1% nationally.

Although some people chose not to answer the census's question about religious affiliation, 27.5% had no religion, 41.0% were Christian, 0.4% had Māori religious beliefs, 14.5% were Hindu, 6.8% were Muslim, 3.0% were Buddhist and 1.8% had other religions.

Of those at least 15 years old, 1,407 (32.3%) people had a bachelor's or higher degree, and 582 (13.4%) people had no formal qualifications. 705 people (16.2%) earned over $70,000 compared to 17.2% nationally. The employment status of those at least 15 was that 2,211 (50.8%) people were employed full-time, 597 (13.7%) were part-time, and 189 (4.3%) were unemployed.

Landmarks and features
The Arkell Homestead, a historic country homestead owned by the Arkell family at 461 Hillsborough Road. The homestead was used as a home for the Sisters of the Good Shepherd, St Joseph, and is now a part of the Metlifecare Retirement Village.
Waikōwhai Park, a large park bordering the Manukau Harbour, which was created on land gifted by the Wesleyan Mission Trust to the Mt Roskill Road Board in 1909. Th park opened in February 1914, and became a popular destination for swimming, camping and picnics in the early 20th century.
The Waikōwhai Walkway, a  path linking Onehunga to Lynfield Cove.
The northern Manukau Harbour coast, including Cape Horn, Waikowhai Bay, Faulkner Bay and Wesley Bay

Education

It opened in 1964, and was originally used as a campus for the North Shore Teachers Training College.

Both schools are coeducational. Rolls are as of 

Secondary schools in the area are Lynfield College and Mount Roskill Grammar School. Catholic secondary schools serving the area are Marcellin College and St Peter's College.

References

Bibliography

External links
Photographs of Waikowhai held in Auckland Libraries' heritage collections.

Suburbs of Auckland
Populated places around the Manukau Harbour